Carl-Enock Svensson (3 January 1895 – 27 October 1986) was a Swedish athlete. He competed in the men's pentathlon at the 1920 Summer Olympics.

References

1895 births
1986 deaths
Athletes (track and field) at the 1920 Summer Olympics
Swedish pentathletes
Olympic athletes of Sweden
Sportspeople from Lund